Sir Peter Roylance Delamothe OBE (29 June 190426 October 1973) was an ophthalmological surgeon and member of the Queensland Legislative Assembly.

Early years
Born Peter Roylance de la Mothe at Spring Hill, Brisbane, to parents Charles Joseph de la Mothe, a chemist who had moved to Australia from France, and his wife Anna Mary (née Oliver), he was educated at St Francis School in Hughenden, and then Mount Carmel College in Charters Towers. Awarded an open scholarship after coming third in the state for his final examinations, Delamothe entered the University of Sydney where he obtained M.B. and B.S. degrees. Between 1927 and 1930, he served as a junior, then senior, resident medical officer at Sydney Hospital, where he also practiced  ophthalmological surgery before entering into private practice. It was around this time that he anglicized his name to Delamothe.

By January 1933, Delamothe was back in Queensland and appointed as the medical superintendent of the Collinsville hospital. Known for his hard work, he performed seventy-seven operations in his first seven weeks there, which greatly increased the hospital's popularity with the local population. In early 1936, he moved to Bowen and set up his own practice.

On 26 October 1940, Delamothe joined the Royal Australian Air Force as a probationary flight lieutenant and was based at several different hospitals and medical receiving stations. By October 1944 he had been promoted to the rank of temporary wing commander and was transferred to the reserves.

Political career
In 1939, Delamothe stood as an independent for the mayoralty of Bowen but was unsuccessful. After World War II, he once again stood for the position at the 1946 council elections and this time was successful and went on to serve for twelve years. During this time he carried on with his medical practice and at one stage locating his surgery in the municipal chambers. Delamothe fought hard for the construction of a major highway diversion to Bowen but his efforts proved fruitless. He oversaw the start of a sewerage system for the town and the first co-ordinated attempts made to attract tourists to the region.

In April 1958, Bowen was hit by a cyclone, destroying most of the town. As the cyclone was at it worst, Mayor Delamothe was performing surgery by torchlight on a critically ill patient at the local hospital, which had already lost its roof.
 
Delamothe accepted the Liberal nomination for the resurrected electorate of Bowen at the 1960 state elections and went on to win the seat, holding it until it was  abolished in 1971. Within three years of entering the parliament he was appointed Minister for Justice and Attorney-General, holding the role until his retirement from politics in December 1971. From June 1967, Delamothe was also the Deputy Leader of the Queensland Liberal Party.

During his time as Minister for Justice and Attorney-General, Delamothe acted to ease the backlog of cases in Queensland courts, and helped establish the Law Reform Commission and the Legal Aid Bureau. He introduced weekend detention and work-release programs for minor offenders and reduced prison overcrowding by convincing the government to carry out an extensive building program.

Delamothe reformed Queensland's alcohol laws, enabling Brisbane hotels to remain open on Sundays and for the first time women were allowed into the public bar. He was also responsible for introducing the state's first consumer protection laws.

On 20 December 1971, the day after his retirement from parliament, Delamothe took up an appointment as the Queensland Agent-General in London. He held the role until serious illness forced his resignation in September 1973.

Personal life
At the Ashfield Methodist Church in Sydney, Delamothe married Myrtle Eunice Lois Bussell on 23 April 1931 and they had four sons. Their marriage later ended in divorce and on 17 May 1947 he married Joan Patricia Milner at the Australian Inland Mission Hall in Broome, Western Australia. This marriage was to produce a son and two daughters.

In 1959 he was appointed an Officer of the Order of the British Empire (OBE), and he was knighted in June 1973. Delamothe died of cancer at St Mary's Hospital in Paddington, London in October 1973. He was cremated and his ashes scattered on Bowen harbour.

References

1904 births
1973 deaths
Members of the Queensland Legislative Assembly
Liberal Party of Australia members of the Parliament of Queensland
People from Brisbane
Australian Officers of the Order of the British Empire
Australian Knights Bachelor
Australian politicians awarded knighthoods
Royal Australian Air Force personnel of World War II
20th-century Australian politicians